Trones is a headland and residential area in the municipality of Verdal in Trøndelag county, Norway. The villages of Nordskaget and Sørskaget are located on the headland, and they are combined under the name Trones by Statistics Norway.

References

Verdal
Villages in Trøndelag